Beckie Herbert (born 23 June 1986) is a field hockey player from England.

International Senior Tournaments
 2006 – 2006 Commonwealth Games, Melbourne
 2011 – Champions Trophy, Amstelveen,

1986 births
Living people
English female field hockey players
Place of birth missing (living people)
Commonwealth Games medallists in field hockey
Commonwealth Games bronze medallists for England
Loughborough Students field hockey players
Field hockey players at the 2006 Commonwealth Games
Medallists at the 2006 Commonwealth Games